Steinbach is a small river of Lower Saxony and of North Rhine-Westphalia, Germany. It is a right tributary of the Laerbach, which itself is a tributary of the Else.

See also
List of rivers of Lower Saxony
List of rivers of North Rhine-Westphalia

Rivers of Lower Saxony
Rivers of North Rhine-Westphalia
Rivers of Germany